Natsu may refer to:

People
, Japanese comedian
, Japanese footballer
, Japanese professional wrestler
, Japanese dancer

Characters
Natsu Dragneel, the main character in the Fairy Tail anime and manga series
Natsu Ayuhara, a character in the Rival Schools video game series
Natsu (Soulcalibur), a character in the Soul video game series
Natsu Hinata, a minor character in the Haikyuu anime and manga series

Japanese unisex given names